Mount Jedediah Smith ( is located in the Teton Range, on the border of Caribou-Targhee National Forest and Grand Teton National Park in the U.S. state of Wyoming. Mount Jedediah Smith is about  WSW of Mount Meek.

References

Mountains of Grand Teton National Park
Mountains of Wyoming
Mountains of Teton County, Wyoming